John Orr  was an 18th-century Irish Anglican priest.

Barton was educated at Trinity College, Dublin, He was Rector of Maryborough then Archdeacon of Ferns from 1757 until his 1767.

Notes

Alumni of Trinity College Dublin
18th-century Irish Anglican priests
Archdeacons of Ferns